These are the results of the rhythmic group all-around competition, one of the two events of the rhythmic gymnastics discipline contested in the gymnastics at the 2004 Summer Olympics in Athens. The qualification and final rounds took place on August 26 and August 28 at the Galatsi Olympic Hall.

Results 
Ten national teams, each composed by six gymnasts, competed in the group all-around event in the rhythmic gymnastics qualification round on August 26.
The eight highest scoring teams advanced to the final on August 28.

Qualification

Final

References 

 Gymnastics Results.com

Women's rhythmic group all-around
2004
2004 in women's gymnastics
Women's events at the 2004 Summer Olympics